Razuyeh (also Romanized as Razūyeh and Raẕavīyeh; also known as Raẕavī) is a village in Zibad Rural District, Kakhk District, Gonabad County, Razavi Khorasan Province, Iran. At the 2006 census, its population was 55, in 19 families.

References 

Populated places in Gonabad County